Jacob Katonon (born 5 October 1969) is a Kenyan former triple jumper who competed in the 1996 Summer Olympics.

References

External links
 

1969 births
Living people
Kenyan male triple jumpers
Olympic athletes of Kenya
Athletes (track and field) at the 1996 Summer Olympics
African Games gold medalists for Kenya
African Games medalists in athletics (track and field)
Athletes (track and field) at the 1994 Commonwealth Games
Commonwealth Games competitors for Kenya
Athletes (track and field) at the 1995 All-Africa Games